Pseudopogonogaster mirabilis is a species of praying mantis native to Colombia and Ecuador.

See also
List of mantis genera and species

References

Mantidae
Arthropods of Colombia
Invertebrates of Ecuador
Insects described in 1942